Anne "Annie" Laird (born 20 May 1970) is a Scottish curler. 

In 1991, Laird won a bronze medal at the World Junior Curling Championships playing lead for Gillian Barr.

In 2002, Laird was a member of the gold medal-winning team at the World Curling Championships, playing lead for Jackie Lockhart.

Laird replaced Karen Addison as the alternate in the British curling team for the 2010 Winter Olympic Games, after Addison was deselected.

References

External links
 

1970 births
Living people
Scottish female curlers
British female curlers
Olympic curlers of Great Britain
Curlers at the 2010 Winter Olympics
World curling champions
Continental Cup of Curling participants